Pagsanjan Arch also known as Puerto Real or Arco Real is a historic town gate of Pagsanjan, Laguna, Philippines built from 1878 to 1880 under the supervision of Fray Cipriano Bac. The arch was built by the people of Pagsanjan to express gratitude to their patroness, the Our Lady of Guadalupe, from protecting the town from bandits in 1877.

Location 
The arch is located at the western entrance of the town along the National Highway. It leads to Rizal Street (formerly Calle Real) of the town.

History

The Story of the Bandits and the Virgin of Guadalupe 
Bandits (or tulisanes) were rampant in Laguna during the last years of the Spanish colonization. Even the guardia civil at that time cannot control the acts of the tulisanes. On midnight of December 8, 1877, a group of bandits led by Tangkad who already plundered the nearby town of Majayjay is nearly approaching the western entrance of Pagsanjan. When the bandits are approaching the town, a beautiful lady dressed in white and holding a shining sword appeared to them. Using her sword, she drew a line and proclaimed  that the town is under her protection. The bandits experienced fear and immediately went to the mountains. Mang Juan, a sabungero who lives near the western entrance saw the whole event because of his insomnia that night. He told the event to the Spanish cura who later told it to the government authorities. All of them do not believe the story of Mang Juan until they went to the exact site and saw the mark of the Virgin's sword. To express their gratitude to their patroness, the Virgin of Guadalupe, they built a stone gate on the exact site where they saw the mark of the Virgin's sword.

Construction and Restoration of the Arch 
Under the supervision of a Franciscan priest, Fray Cipriano Bac and Don Manuel de Yriarte, the Pagsanjan Arch was built from 1878 to 1880 by the town people through forced labor or polo y servicio. It was also known as Puerta Real or Royal Gate during the Spanish and American occupation.

During the Japanese liberation of the town, municipal authorities vandalized the historic gate by having it painted in a gaudy pink color, including the coat-of-arms and the two Castillan lions. The word Pagsanjan and the years of its construction, 1878–1880, written below it on the upper part of the gate's western facade were defaced and replaced with the greeting, "Welcome", and on the eastern side, "Thank U, Come Again". Historian Gregorio F. Zaide, a native of the town, started a project to restore the historic gate through Pagsanjeños in Manila who generously gave ₱5,000. Upon obtaining permission from the National Historic Institute (now National Historical Commission of the Philippines), the restoration process commenced under the supervision of Engr. Tito Rivera and was completed on May 25, 1975. A large copper plaque was placed on the wall of the first arch to thank the donors. Today, the Pagsanjan arch still stands on a main thoroughfare of the town.

Architectural style 
Pagsanjan arch is well known for its three Roman arches or gates made of adobe stones, lime and carabao milk. On top of the arch is the Royal coat-of-arms of Spain (or escutcheon) in gold and yellow guarded by two red Castillan lions.

Heritage designation

The arch was declared as a national landmark by the National Historical Commission of the Philippines on December 6, 2018. A historical marker was unveiled.

See also 
 Diocesan Shrine of Our Lady of Guadalupe

References 

Marked Historical Structures of the Philippines
Spanish Colonial architecture in the Philippines
Triumphal arches in the Philippines
Buildings and structures completed in 1880
Buildings and structures in Laguna (province)
19th-century architecture in the Philippines